Gercüş (") is a town and seat of the Gercüş District of Batman Province in Turkey. The mayor is Abdulkerim Kaya (BDP).

The population was 6,064 in 2021.

Neighborhoods 
The town is divided into the neighborhoods of Bağlarbaşı, Çukurçeşme, Pınarbaşı and Yolağzı.

History 
The town of Gercus is said to be built by a wealthy Roman soldier named "Gawson" who named the village after him. The town was formerly populated by Assyrians but mainly Kurds from the Kercoz tribe live in the town today.

Notable people 

 Cigerxwîn

References

Populated places in Batman Province
Assyrian communities in Turkey
Gercüş District

Kurdish settlements in Batman Province